Thathri–Gandoh National Highway (also Thathri–Gandoh Road) is a  road that connects Thathri to Gandoh, located in the Doda district of Jammu and Kashmir, India. The road serves as a lifeline for the people living in the Bhalessa region as it provides access to various link roads leading to rural and far-flung areas. In 2022, this road was declared a National Highway by Lieutenant Governor of Jammu and Kashmir Manoj Sinha.

History

The Thathri–Gandoh Road was initially proposed by Prime Minister Bakshi Ghulam Mohammad in 1962, but the construction did not commence until 1967–1968. However, it was only in 1975 that the road was made motorable up to Gandoh town, albeit only in fair weather conditions. In 2022, it was declared a National Highway.

Route

The road passes through several small towns and villages, including Kahara, Jakyas, Bhatyas, etc., providing access to various government offices, hospitals, schools, and markets. The highway is prone to accidents.

References

Chenab Valley
Roads in Jammu and Kashmir